Alafaya is a census-designated place and unincorporated area in Orange County, Florida, United States. The population was 78,113 at the 2010 census. It is part of the Orlando–Kissimmee–Sanford, Florida Metropolitan Statistical Area. It is most known for being near the University of Central Florida and Waterford Lakes.

Geography
Alafaya is located in eastern Orange County, Florida, in a broad zone south of State Road 50.

Demographics

As of the census of 2010, there were 78,113 people, 27,270 households, and 19,215 families residing in the CDP. The population density was 790/km2 (2,100/mi2). There were 30,012 housing units at an average density of 304.4/km2 (787.7/mi2). The racial makeup of the CDP was 75.1% White, 10.4% African American, 0.3% Native American, 6.8% Asian, 0.1% Pacific Islander, 6.9% from other races, and 4.0% from two or more races. Hispanic or Latino people of any race were 32.6% of the population.

There were 27,270 households, out of which 39.4% had children under the age of 18 living with them, 52.2% were married husband-wife couples living together, 13.2% had a female householder with no husband present, and 29.5% were non-families. 17.5% of all households were made up of individuals, and 2.4% had someone living alone who was 65 years of age or older. The average household size was 2.86 and the average family size was 3.30.

In the CDP, the population was spread out, with 26.5% under the age of 18, 13.5% from 18 to 24, 32.2% from 25 to 44, 21.0% from 45 to 64, and 5.6% who were 65 years of age or older. The median age was 30 years. For every 100 females, there were 96.5 males. For every 100 females age 18 and over, there were 94.0 males.

Educational institutions
Timber Creek High School
Discovery Middle School
Legacy Middle School
Avalon Middle School
Castle Creek Elementary
Bonneville Middle School
Sunrise Elementary School
Waterford Elementary School
Timber Springs Middle School

References

Unincorporated communities in Orange County, Florida
Census-designated places in Orange County, Florida
Greater Orlando
Census-designated places in Florida
Unincorporated communities in Florida